Kirstin McLean is a Scottish actress from Cardonald. She is best known for her roles on the second and third series of Limmy's Show. She has also appeared in River City, Doors Open, and Frankie Boyle's Tramadol Nights.

References

External links

Living people
Scottish television actresses
Year of birth missing (living people)